Abd al-Malik ibn Umar ibn Marwan ibn al-Hakam (– ), also known as al-Marwani, was an Umayyad prince, general and governor of Seville under the first Umayyad emir of al-Andalus (Islamic Spain), Abd al-Rahman I. He led two major campaigns in 758 and 774, the first against the previous ruler of al-Andalus Yusuf ibn Abd al-Rahman al-Fihri and the second against the rebellious troops of Seville and Beja. His victories solidified the Umayyad emirate's control of western al-Andalus. His descendants continued to play important political and military roles in the Emirate well into the 10th century.

Ancestry

Abd al-Malik ibn Umar was born . He was a grandson of the Umayyad caliph Marwan I. His father Umar was the caliph's only son by Zaynab bint Umar. She was a paternal granddaughter of Abu Salama from the prominent Banu Makhzum clan of the Quraysh tribe and a daughter of the Islamic prophet Muhammad's stepson. 

Umar resided in Fustat, the capital of Egypt, a province of the Syria-centred caliphate. His house there was bestowed on him by his half-brother, the governor of Egypt Abd al-Aziz ibn Marwan. The 'Umar ibn Marwan' mentioned in two Greek papyri from Egypt may be identified with Abd al-Malik's father. Abd al-Malik was initially established in Egypt.

Career
When the Umayyad Caliphate was toppled by the Abbasids in 750 they carried out mass executions of the Umayyad dynasty in Syria, Iraq, Egypt and Arabia. Several, mostly less eminent Umayyads, including Abd al-Malik, escaped to al-Andalus (Islamic Spain). The early Islamic sources hold that he left Egypt and arrived in al-Andalus in 757 or 758.  However, modern historian , considers that Abd al-Malik most likely arrived in 754 or 755. He was accompanied by his cousin Juzayy ibn Abd al-Aziz ibn Marwan (d. 757) and their respective children. His distant Umayyad kinsman, a great-great-grandson of Marwan I Abd al-Rahman I, established himself on the peninsula in 755–756 with the support of local Umayyad  (non-Arab Muslim freedmen or clients) and friendly Syrian troops in the region and proclaimed himself emir (governor or ruler) in Cordoba. Abd al-Malik was the eldest of the Marwanids in al-Andalus. He is generally credited with counselling Abd al-Rahman to drop the name of the Abbasid caliph al-Mansur from the Friday prayer—a traditional acknowledgement of Islamic sovereignty—in 757. 

Abd al-Malik gained the confidence of Abd al-Rahman. He became one of the Emir's top generals and a strongman of the nascent Umayyad emirate as it expanded its control over the chiefs of the practically autonomous Arab  (armies or garrisons) and older-established elites across al-Andalus. Although permanent command of the Emir's army was given to his two  Badr and Abu Uthman Ubayd Allah ibn Uthman, Abd al-Malik was given command of expeditions in 758 and 774.

Abd al-Malik had been replaced by a leader of the Seville , Abu al-Sabbah al-Yahsubi, but the latter rebelled against Abd al-Rahman and was dismissed from his post. Abd al-Malik was the only member of Abd al-Rahman's court to advocate for Abu al-Sabbah's execution, reportedly telling the Emir:Don't let him get away: for he will bring us calamity  Take a firm hand and rid yourself of this sickness. Abd al-Rahman apparently informed his court that he had already had Abu al-Sabbah executed. During the campaign, Abd al-Malik ordered the execution of his own son Umayya, the commander of his vanguard, for retreating before the rebels in battle. Abd al-Malik's victory sealed the submission of western al-Andalus to the Umayyad emirate. Abd al-Rahman's confidence in Abd al-Malik was also strengthened by the marriage of Abd al-Rahman's son and chosen successor Hisham I to Abd al-Malik's daughter Kanza.

Death and legacy
His decisive victories on behalf of Abd al-Rahman were key to the establishment of the Umayyad emirate in al-Andalus. His sons Abd Allah, Ibrahim and al-Hakam all served as viziers of Abd al-Rahman. A branch of the family settled in Seville and the western areas of the peninsula. As Umayyads, members of Abd al-Malik's family viewed themselves as equals to the ruling emirs in Cordoba. 

Abd al-Malik's grandson al-Abbas ibn Abd Allah served as the governor of Beja under Hisham I. Another descendant, Ahmad ibn al-Bara ibn Malik ibn Abd Allah, was appointed governor of Zaragoza by Emir al-Mundhir, but was suspected of disloyalty and assassinated by order of al-Mundhir's successor Abd Allah. The wider family in Seville joined the rebellion against Abd Allah but relocated to Cordoba when the troops of Seville surrendered to Emir Abd al-Rahman III in 913. Thereafter, several served as governors, generals and viziers. Another of Abd al-Malik's descendants, Ahmad ibn Ishaq al-Qurashi, was a pretender to the Umayyad Caliphate in al-Andalus in the 10th century.

Notes

References

Bibliography

718 births
778 deaths
8th-century Arabs
8th-century Egyptian people
People from the Emirate of Córdoba
People from Seville
Umayyad dynasty